Promi Big Brother 2021, also known as Promi Big Brother 9, is the ninth season of the German reality television series Promi Big Brother. The show began airing on 6 August 2021 on Sat.1 and will end after 24 days on 27 August 2021, making it the second longest celebrity season to date. It is the ninth celebrity season and the tenth season of Big Brother in total to air on Sat.1 to date. Jochen Schropp and Marlene Lufen both returned as hosts of the show.

Production

Eye Logo
Like in the previous season, the eye logo is the same.

Teasers
In July 2021, a twenty-second teaser promoting the season was released.

Opening Intro
The song of this year's intro and outro is "The Passenger" from season 1 housemate David Hasselhoff. Like in the previous season, the intro for the matches is "The Hanging Tree" from James Newton Howard featuring Jennifer Lawrence.

House
This year's overall and house theme is space. As with previous seasons, the house is separated into two areas: the "Everything" area, known as "Big Planet", and the "Nothing" area, known as "Space Station". Unlike in previous seasons, however, there are no walls completely separating the two areas. Instead, there is a small area where the two sides can meet each other. The area was revealed on Day 6.

The "Everything" area, Big Planet, consist of an open dome for the lounge and bedroom, as well as an outdoor kitchen and dining area with a jacuzzi and an upstairs balcony area, encouraging more discussions and gossips amongst other housemates.

The "Nothing" area, Space Station, is a combination of all rooms in one area, with little and cramped space to walk and no outdoor lightning from the inside. Penny also returned for this season, known as "Space Penny". In addition, housemates in the Space Station will also have to wear a uniform at all times. On Days 1-3, Big Brother would provide dried food as initial housemates' basic rations. The food was then discarded on Day 3, in favour of the return of Penny.

Spin-off shows

Die Late Night Show
The live late-night show with the name Die Late Night Show returned and will air every day after the main show. Unlike in previous seasons, the late night show will not be broadcast on sixx, but on Sat.1. Jochen Bendel and Melissa Khalaj returned as hosts of the late-night show. Special guests joined the presenter duo to analyze the situation of the show and it also features exclusive live broadcasts from the house.

Special guests

Das jüngste Gerücht
The web show Das jüngste Gerücht (The youngest rumor) was published on Facebook and IGTV from 22 July 2021. In the five- to seven-minute episodes, Jochen Bendel and Melissa Khalaj commented on and discussed all speculation as to who might be entering the house. Until 1 August 2021, a new episode and a total of four episodes were published on Thursday, Monday, Wednesday and Sunday. On the fourth episode, Cora Schumacher joined Bendel and Khalaj on the show. The fifth and last episode was published on 6 August.

Housemates
On 3 August 2021, the first 8 celebrities housemates, participating in this season, were announced. The ninth housemate Jörg Draeger was confirmed by Sat.1 on August 5 in the press conference. Following the press conference, Daniela Büchner, Danny Liedtke and Marie Lang were announced as further housemates.

On Day 6, three further celebrity housemates, Papis Loveday, Payton Ramolla, Gitta Saxx were moved in, with two more on Day 8, Barbara "Babs" Kijewski and Pascal Kappés. During the show, Babs did not disclose her age on the show.

Big Planet and Space Station

Reasons

 : Melanie & Eric and Rafi & Ina played in the Duel Arena and the two duo winners would moved in the Big Planet. Rafi & Ina won the game. Big Brother gave the chance to the both winners, to choose also two housemates from the Space Station to move to the Big Planet. They choose Heike and Mimi. Then the viewers would choose, who from the 4 housemates would move again from the Big Planet to the Space Station. They choose Mimi.
 : All housemates from the Space Station played in the Duel Arena and the winner would move to the Big Planet. Marie won the duel and moved to the other side. Big Brother gave the chance to Marie to pick two housemates from the Space Station to move with her in the Big Planet. She chose Mimi and Daniela. Then the TV viewers voted for Daniela to move back to the Space Station.
 : The housemates from the Space Station played in the Duel Arena and the winners would move to Big Planet. Melanie, Jörg and Danny won the Duel. The viewers voted for the eight housemates, who were in the Big Planet, and three of them would move to Space Station. Melanie, Rafi and Mimi had the most votes and moved to the Space Station.
 : Four brand new housemates, Paco, Gitta, Papis and Payton competed in the Duel Arena to decide who goes to each area. Papis and Gitta won the Duel, moving them to the Big Planet, with Paco and Payton moving to the Space Station. As the winners of the Duel, Papis and Gitta then have to choose a housemate each to send to the Space Station. They chose Ina and Danny respectively. Soon after, the viewers voted Papis to move to the Space Station.
 : The housemates from the Big Planet chose four housemates from the Space Station for the Duel. If they won, they can stay in the area. If they lost, they would have to switch areas with them. They chose Uwe, Eric, Daniela and Payton. Uwe, Eric, Daniela and Payton ultimately won, meaning that the housemates from the Big Planet has to switch places with the four housemates from the Space Station they competed with. The viewers then voted Melanie and Danny to move to the Big Planet.
 : New housemates, Babs and Pascal competed in a duel. Pascal won and moved to the Big Planet, while Babs moved to the Space Station.
 : The viewers voted Daniela to move to the Space Station.
 : Each area chose a male housemate and a female housemate to compete in a duel. The Space Station chose Babs and Paco, while the Big Planet chose Pascal and Payton. Babs and Paco won, switching areas with Pascal and Payton. The viewers then voted Eric to move to the Space Station.
 : Big Brother initially moved all the housemates from the Big Planet to the Space Station. All housemates in the Space Station (before the move) competed in a duel in pairs, with only one of the pair competing. Papis and Daniela won the Duel, moving them to the Big Planet. Papis also had the power to select three housemates from the Space Station to join them. He chose Paco, Jörg and Gitta to move to the Big Planet.
 : The viewers voted Daniela to move to the Space Station.
 : Babs, Eric, Ina and Melanie won the Match Arena and moved to the Big Planet, while Paco, Papis, Jörg and Gitta lost the Match Arena and had to move to the Space Station. The four winners could pick one housemate from the Space Station to move with them in the Big Planet. They choose Marie. At the end of the Live Show on the 17th August the viewers voted for Babs to return to the Space Station.
 : Due to a measurement error in the previous duel, Big Brother reverted back the area changes on Day 14.
 : As the team captain of the winning team in the duel, Paco chose Danny, Daniela and Melanie to join them in the Big Planet. The viewers then voted Daniela, Gitta and Papis to move to the Space Station.
 : The housemates in the Big Planet had to choose one person to move to the Space Station. They chose Paco. In exchange for the move, Paco must also name two housemates from the Space Station to move to the Big Planet. He chose Eric and Marie. The viewers then voted Eric to move back to the Space Station.
 : Daniela, Paco, Papis and Uwe won the duel, exchanging areas with Danny, Jörg, Marie and Melanie. The viewers then voted Ina to move to the Big Planet.
 : All housemates were merged into the Space Station.
 : All housemates were moved to the Big Planet for the finale.

Duel Arena 
The Duel Arena, also known as the match Arena, returned for this season. The Duel Arena is mainly served to determine the areas of where each housemate would be as well as other decisions from supermarket budget to nominations. Most of the games are space-themed as per this season's theme. In most of the duels, housemates in the Space Station would have to compete with the housemates in the Big Planet for area exchanges and some miscellaneous duels. In the case of a tie, the housemates in the Big Planet would automatically win the duel.
 Housemates from the Big Planet
 Housemates from the Space Station

Area Exchange
The housemates in the Space Station have an opportunity to move to the Big Planet, if won the duel. New housemates also have to compete against each other to determine their area to stay. In later duels, the housemates in the Big Planet would also have to compete against the housemates in the Space Station to stay in their area

Nominations Influence
The housemates have a chance to influence the nominations by winning the duel.

Miscellaneous Duels 
In rare occasions, housemates have an opportunity to earn luxuries and reward, if they win the duel, other than area exchange or nominations.

Supermarket Purchases
The Penny market, which is part of a Product placement, once again serves as a supermarket where the housemates of the poor area can shop on a budget. This is now referred to as a supply capsule. In this season, the housemates decide among themselves who is allowed to shop. Each housemate can only go shopping once. 

The housemates have the budget of 1€ per person per day per shopping. The remainder money does not carry over to the next day. Occasionally, they also have a chance to earn more money from Duels.

  As the amount spent ended with a one, all housemates in the Space Station were able to choose one extra item each from the supermarket.
  The cash register crashed before the timer ended. This was the amount before the double scan of an item and the crash. Jörg was able to keep all the items he purchased up to that point, despite multiple mistakes.
  Iris is a guest on the show on Day 21, known for being Uwe's wife.

Nominations table

Notes

 : There were no nominations this round. Instead, the viewers voted for their favourite housemate. The housemate with the fewest votes was evicted. The voting lines were opened on Day 6.
 : For this round, only five housemates were eligible to nominate. The nominating housemates were chosen by the viewers. Each nominating housemate must name two nominees, instead of one. After the nominations, the nominated housemates competed in a duel to earn safety from the public vote. Melanie won this duel, thus no longer faced the public vote.
 : Danny, Eric, Marie, Papis, Payton and Uwe were immune from nominations after the duels on Days 12 and 13.
 : Before the nominations, Daniela, Danny, Payton and Uwe won the power the select an envelope each containing either a killer nomination card or an immunity card. They can use them for themselves or pass it on to another housemate. Danny got the killer nomination card and used it for himself, while Uwe also got the same card, but passed it on to Ina. Payton got the immunity card and used it for herself, while Daniela also got the same card, but passed it on to Paco. This round of nominations was made face-to-face.
 : After the first duel, Eric, Ina, Papis and Payton had the power to choose one person from their team to be immune from this round of nominations. They chose Eric.
 : Before the nominations, the losers of the duel, Daniela, Gitta, Marie and Uwe, had to choose one person from their team to automatically be nominated for this round of nominations. They chose Daniela. As the winners of the duel, only Danny, Jörg, Melanie and Paco were able to nominate. Each nominating housemate must name two nominees, instead of one.
 : For this round, the most popular housemate in a popularity poll, Papis, was immune from this nominations. The least popular housemates, Danny, Ina, Jörg and Uwe were automatically nominated.
 : All housemates in the Big Planet were immune after Papis and Ina's win in the duel. In addition, they were also eligible to nominate.
 : As the result of the duels on Day 22, Danny won a final ticket, granting him immunity from nominations until the finale.
 : This round of nominations was made face-to-face. Uwe nominated himself for this eviction, which is against the rules. As a result, he was automatically put up for eviction by Big Brother.
 : As the winner of the day's duel, Melanie had a choice to either nominate two housemates for eviction or nominate only one housemate, but with double points for that nomination. She chose to nominate two housemates for eviction.

Ratings

References

External links
Official Homepage

2021 German television seasons
09